In the field of molecular biology, trans-acting (trans-regulatory, trans-regulation), in general, means "acting from a different molecule" (i.e., intermolecular).  It may be considered the opposite of cis-acting (cis-regulatory, cis-regulation), which, in general, means "acting from the same molecule" (i.e., intramolecular).

In the context of transcription regulation, a trans-acting factor is usually a regulatory protein that binds to DNA.  The binding of a trans-acting factor to a cis-regulatory element in DNA can cause changes in transcriptional expression levels.  microRNAs or other diffusible molecules are also examples of trans-acting factors that can regulate target sequences.
The trans-acting gene may be on a different chromosome to the target gene, but the activity is via the intermediary protein or RNA that it encodes.  Cis-acting elements, on the other hand, do not code for protein or RNA.  Both the trans-acting gene and the protein/RNA that it encodes are said to "act in trans" on the target gene.

See also
 Trans-regulatory element
 Transactivation
 Transrepression

References

Genetics terms
Molecular biology